The Great Armament was the popular name given to the rapid build-up in the strength of the British Royal Navy as a consequence of the need for inshore warfare vessels that emerged during the 1854-56 Crimean War against Russia. These forces were for deployment not only in the Black Sea and Sea of Azof, but equally in the campaigns in the Baltic Sea and Gulf of Bothnia. Following the end of that war, many of the numerous steam-driven gunboats produced as part of the Great Armament were deployed in many other locations around the world, as far apart as Africa and China.

Orders

Between 27 March 1854, when Britain declared war on Russia (France followed suit the next day) and 30 March 1856, when the Treaty of Peace was signed in Paris, the following small naval vessels were ordered by the British Admiralty; all except the mortar vessels (which were sail propelled only) and the (iron-hulled) mortar floats (which were not self-propelled) had steam screw propulsion:

The above list excludes major warships (ships of the line and frigates) ordered during this two-year period.

References
 Winfield, Rif; Lyon, David (2004). The Sail and Steam Navy List: All the Ships of the Royal Navy 1815–1889. London: Chatham Publishing. .

History of the Royal Navy
Crimean War